Culture Club's discography consists of 6 studio albums, 9 compilation albums, 3 box sets, 3 extended plays, 24 regular commercial singles, and 5 promotional singles, largely released during the 1980s and 1990s. Culture Club has sold more than 50 million records worldwide, including 7 million records in the United States.

For the comprehensive Boy George solo discography, see Boy George discography.

Albums

Studio albums

Live albums

Compilation albums

Box sets

EPs

Singles

Promotional and other singles
 1984–89: 19 flexi discs titled "Boy Talk" were issued by Culture Club's official Multicultural Fan Club between March 1984 and December 1989
 1985: "Don't Talk About It" (Mexico-only promo release)
 1986: "Heaven's Children"/"Come Clean" (cancelled release)
 1992: "Culture Club Megamix" (Sweden-only promo release)
 1999: "Sign Language" (promo release)
 2000: "See Thru" (promo release as the moniker CD:UK)
 2003: "If I Were You" (promo release)

Videos

Video albums

Music videos

Notes

References

External links
 Culture Club at Discogs
 Culture Club at AllMusic
 Culture Club at Rate Your Music

Discography
Discographies of British artists
Pop music group discographies
Rock music group discographies
New wave discographies